The following is the discography of American R&B group Color Me Badd.

Albums

Studio albums

Compilation albums

Remix albums

Singles

Notes

References

Discographies of American artists
Rhythm and blues discographies